RTVi is a Canadian exempt Category B Russian language specialty channel owned by Ethnic Channels Group (ECG). It broadcasts programming from RTVi and local Canadian content.

RTVi is a general entertainment channel that caters to the Russian diaspora in North America & Israel. It features a programming lineup created specifically for Russian speaking audiences outside of Russia and includes movies, news, and sports, as well as coverage of local and international community events.

Logos

History
In September 2003, ECG was granted approval from the Canadian Radio-television and Telecommunications Commission (CRTC) to launch a specialty channel called Russian TV One, described as "an ethnic Category 21 specialty television service... targeting the Russian-speaking community."

The channel launched on June 23, 2004, along with 3 other channels from ECG, as RTVi, through a licensing agreement with the Russian broadcaster.

A sister-channel, branded RTVi+ was launched in the Fall of 2005, however, it was discontinued in 2009.

On November 4, 2014, the CRTC approved EGC's request to convert RTVi from a licensed Category B (formerly category 2) specialty service to an exempted category B third language service.

References

External links
 RTVi Canada
 RTVi 

Digital cable television networks in Canada
Multicultural and ethnic television in Canada
Television channels and stations established in 2004
Russian-language television stations
Russian-Canadian culture
RTVI